This is a list of the etymology of street names in the London district of Belgravia. The following utilises the generally accepted boundaries of the area viz. South Carriage Drive to the north, Grosvenor Gardens/Place/Square to the east, Buckingham Palace Road/Victoria railway line to the south-east and Chelsea Bridge Road, Lower Sloane Street/Sloane Square/Sloane Street to the west.
 
 Albert Gate – named for Albert, Prince Consort, husband of Queen Victoria
 Ann's Close – unknown
 Avery Farm Row – after a former farm here of this name; 'Avery' is a corruption of 'Ebury'
 Belgrave Mews South, Belgrave Mews West, Belgrave Place, Belgrave Square, Belgrave Yard, Lower Belgrave Street and Upper Belgrave Street – after local landowners the Grosvenors (titled Viscounts Belgrave), after their home estate of Belgrave, Cheshire; the building of this area started under the tutelage of Richard Grosvenor, 2nd Marquess of Westminster
 Bloomfield Terrace – alteration of 'Blomfield', after Charles James Blomfield, Bishop of London 1828 – 1856, who consecrated the nearby Church of St Barnabas, Pimlico
 Boscobel Place – after a former pub here called the Royal Oak, by association with Charles II who hid from Parliamentary forces in the Royal Oak at Boscobel House
 Bowland Yard
 Bourne Street – as this used to run beside the river Westbourne
 Buckingham Palace Road – by association with Buckingham Palace, originally built for John Sheffield, Duke of Buckingham
 Bunhouse Place – after a former shop here selling Chelsea buns
 Burton Mews
 Cadogan Lane and Cadogan Place – after Lord Cadogan, owner of this land when Henry Holland started building on this land in the 1750s
 Capener's Close – after John Capener, 19th century builder who owned a carpentry/undertakers business here
 Caroline Terrace – unknown
 Chapel Street – after a former Lock chapel here adjacent to a hospital, both now demolished
 Chelsea Bridge Road – as it leads to Chelsea Bridge opened 1858
 Chesham Close, Chesham Mews, Chesham Place and Chesham Street – after the Lowndes family, former local landowners, whose seat was at Chesham, Buckinghamshire
 Chester Close, Chester Cottages, Chester Mews, Chester Row, Chester Square, Chester Square Mews, Chester Street and Little Chester Street – after local landowners the Grosvenors (titled Viscounts Belgrave), who owned land in Chester
 Cliveden Place – after local landowners the Grosvenors (titled Viscounts Belgrave), who owned Cliveden House in Buckinghamshire in the late 19th century
 Cundy Street – after Thomas Cundy and his son, surveyors to local landowners the Grosvenors in the 19th century
 Dorset Mews – presumably after the Dorset landholding of the Grosvenor family 
 Dove Walk
 D'Oyley Street – after Sarah D'Oyley, who inherited land here from her grandfather Hans Sloane
 Duplex Rid
 Eaton Close, Eaton Mews North, Eaton Mews South, Eaton Mews West, Eaton Place, Eaton Row, Eaton Square, Eaton Terrace, Eaton Terrace Mews, South Eaton Place and West Eaton Place – after local landowners the Grosvenors (titled Viscounts Belgrave), whose family seat is Eaton Hall, Cheshire
 Ebury Bridge Road, Ebury Mews, Ebury Mews East, Ebury Square and Ebury Street – as this area was formerly part of the manor of Ebury, thought to have originated as a Latinisation of the Anglo-Saxon toponym 'eyai', which means 'island' in reference to a marsh that once dominated the area
 Eccleston Mews and Eccleston Place – after local landowners the Grosvenors (titled Viscounts Belgrave), who owned land in Eccleston, Cheshire
 Elizabeth Street – after local landowners the Grosvenors (titled Viscounts Belgrave); Elizabeth Leveson-Gower was the wife of Richard Grosvenor, 2nd Marquess of Westminster
 Ellis Street – after Anne Ellis, who inherited land here from her grandfather Hans Sloane
 Frederic Mews – unknown
 Gatliff Road – after John (or Charles) Gatliff, secretary of the Metropolitan Association for Improving the Dwellings of the Industrious Classes
 Gerald Road – unknown
 Graham Terrace – formerly Graham Street after its 19th century lessee/builder William Graham
 Groom Place – after a former pub here called the Horse and Groom
 Grosvenor Cottages, Grosvenor Crescent, Grosvenor Crescent Mews, Grosvenor Gardens, Grosvenor Gardens Mews North, Grosvenor Gardens Mews South, Grosvenor Place and Grosvenor Road – after local landowners the Grosvenors (titled Viscounts Belgrave)
 Halkin Arcade, Halkin Street and West Halkin Street – after local landowners the Grosvenors (titled Viscounts Belgrave), who owned Halkyn Castle in Wales
 Harriet Street and Harriet Walk – after Harriet Lowndes of the Lowndes family, former local landowners
 Headfort Place – after Thomas Taylour, 3rd Marquess of Headfort, who lived nearby on Belgrave Square
 Hobart Place – named after Robert Hobart, 4th Earl of Buckinghamshire, who lived nearby on Grosvenor Place
 Holbein Mews and Holbein Place – after Hans Holbein the Younger, who painted local families for a period in the 1520s; its former name was The Ditch, as it lay next to the river Westbourne
 Kinnerton Place North, Kinnerton Place South, Kinnerton Street and Kinnerton Yard – after local landowners the Grosvenors (titled Viscounts Belgrave), who owned land in Lower Kinnerton, Cheshire
 Knightsbridge – unknown; there are several theories – see Knightsbridge#Origins of name
 Laneborough Place
 Lowndes Close, Lowndes Place, Lowndes Square and Lowndes Street – after the Lowndes family, former local landowners
 Lyall Mews, Lyall Mews West and Lyall Street – after Charles Lyall, business partner with local landowners the Lowndes
 Lygon Place – unknown
 Minera Mews – after local landowners the Grosvenors (titled Viscounts Belgrave), who owned land in Minera, Wales
 Montrose Place – as this lay near a house owned by the Dukes and Duchesses of Montrose
 Motcomb Street – after local landowners the Grosvenors (titled Viscounts Belgrave); Richard Grosvenor, 2nd Marquess of Westminster owned land in Motcombe, Dorset
 Newland Street – unknown; now the western part of Chester Row 
 Old Barrack Yard – as this approached a former barracks located on Wilton Place
 Ormonde Place – probably after the Dukes of Ormonde, who owned Ormonde House in Chelsea 
 Palace Mews – probably by association with the nearby Buckingham Palace Road
 Passmore Street – after its 1830s builder Richard Passmore
 Pembroke Close – unknown
 Phipp's Mews
 Pimlico Road – as it leads to Pimlico, possibly named after Ben Pimlico, 17th century brewer
 Pont Street – thought to be from the French 'pont' (bridge), over the river Westbourne
 Ranelagh Grove – after Richard Jones, 1st Earl of Ranelagh who owned a house near here in the late 17th century
 Rembrandt Close
 Roberts Mews – after Robert Grosvenor, 1st Marquess of Westminster, of the local landowning family the Grosvenors (titled Viscounts Belgrave)
 St Barnabas Street – after the nearby Church of St Barnabas, Pimlico
 St Michael's Mews
 Sedding Street and Sedding Studios – after John Dando Sedding, designer of the nearby Holy Trinity, Sloane Street church
 Semley Place – after local landowners the Grosvenors (titled Viscounts Belgrave), who owned a property called Semley
 Serpentine Walk – as it leads to The Serpentine lake in Hyde Park 
 Seville Street – unknown; it was formerly Charles Street, after Charles Lowndes of the local landowning Lowndes family
 Skinner Place
 Sloane Gardens, Sloane Square, Sloane Street, Sloane Terrace and Lower Sloane Street – after Hans Sloane, local landowner when this area was built up in the 18th century
 South Carriage Drive – after the carriage which formerly used this path 
 Studio Place – as this area was home to many artists' studios in the early 20th century
 Wellington Buildings
 Whittaker Street – after its 1830 builder John Whittaker
 Wilbraham Place – unknown
 William Mews and William Street – after William Lowndes of the local landowning Lowndes family
 Wilton Crescent Mews, Wilton Place, Wilton Row, Wilton Street and Wilton Terrace – after local landowners the Grosvenors (titled Viscounts Belgrave); Eleanor Egerton was the wife of Robert Grosvenor, 1st Marquess of Westminster

References
Citations

Sources

Streets in the Royal Borough of Kensington and Chelsea
Streets in the City of Westminster
Lists of United Kingdom placename etymology
Belgravia
Cadogan Estate
Belgravia
England geography-related lists